Bug-Eyed Bandit is the name of two supervillains appearing in American comic books published by DC Comics.

A female version of the Bug-Eyed Bandit appeared in the Arrowverse shows The Flash and Arrow, played by Emily Kinney.

Publication history 
The Bertram Larvan version of Bug-Eyed Bandit first appeared in The Atom #26 (August-September 1966) and was created by Gardner Fox and Gil Kane.

The second version of Bug-Eyed Bandit first appeared in Justice League America #43 and was created by Keith Giffen, J.M. DeMatteis, and Adam Hughes.

Fictional character biography

Bertram Larvan 
Bertram Larvan was an inventor who designed a mechanical insect to control insect pests. Unfortunately, he had no financial backing to support his invention. He resolved to steal money he needed for his invention. He later used his invention to steal more. Soon, he had an army of mechanical insects. Two of his many insects were stag beetles who could bite through steel and spiders with webs that could support the weight of a man. Bertram took the name of the Bug-Eyed Bandit. He was thwarted by the Atom.

Later, he accidentally discovered the Atom's identity of Ray Palmer and fought him on different occasions. When he was about to use an amnesiac gas he had invented on Atom, he accidentally uses it on himself. He remains in a state of amnesia for years. During the Crisis on Infinite Earths, millions of Shadow Demons, servants of the Anti-Monitor, attack the Earth. Bertram is one of the many casualties. Marv Wolfman has gone on record saying that he killed both the original Bug-Eyed Bandit and the Ten-Eyed Man because he “couldn’t be part of a company that would print [them]".

In Grant Morrison's Animal Man storyline "Deus Ex Machina", Psycho-Pirate, while in Arkham Asylum, recreated characters removed from continuity. The Bug-Eyed Bandit (or a Pre-Crisis version of him) was one of them. Presumably, this character vanished from existence when the Psycho-Pirate's episode of madness ended, along with his colleagues.

A flashback concerning his death happens in  Batman Villains Secret Files and Origins 2005.

Bertram Larvan has been identified as one of the deceased entombed below the Hall of Justice. He is revived as a member of the Black Lantern Corps.

Son of the Bug-Eyed Bandit 

The second Bug-Eyed Bandit is first presented as such in Adventures of Superman. But his first appearances can be traced as far back as Justice League America #43 (1990), where a Bug-Eyed Bandit appeared even though the original was supposed to be dead at the time. The current one is the son of the original Bug-Eyed Bandit, but not very successful.

Bug-Eyed Bandit recently reappeared in Villains United and Infinite Crisis as a member of Alexander Luthor, Jr.'s Society. His current whereabouts are unknown.

Powers and abilities 
The Bug-Eyed Bandit was proficient in the field of robotics and micro-circuitry and used this talent to create a horde of small robotic insects.

In other media 
 The Bug-Eyed Bandit appears in Batman: The Brave and the Bold, voiced by Dee Bradley Baker. This version is able to shrink down to the size of an insect.

 A female version of the Bug-Eyed Bandit named Brie Larvan appears in TV series set in the Arrowverse, portrayed by Emily Kinney. She is a scientist armed with robotic bees loaded with apitoxin that she can control remotely. Introduced in The Flash episode "All Star Team Up", Larvan is fired from her job at Mercury Labs for weaponizing her robotic bees instead of using them for agricultural purposes and kills two of her former coworkers with them. She almost kills her employer, Tina McGee, but Larvan is defeated by the combined efforts of Ray Palmer, the Flash, and Felicity Smoak. Larvan later appears in the Arrow episode "Beacon of Hope". Imprisoned in Iron Heights following the events of "All Star Team Up", Brie uses her court-sanctioned computer time to change her prison release date so she can get out early. Having been diagnosed with a spinal tumor that will render her paraplegic once it is removed, she takes Palmer Technologies' board members hostage using upgraded robotic bees to force Smoak to give her schematics for the prototype microchip that allowed the formerly paralyzed Smoak to walk. Green Arrow and his team try to rescue the hostages, but one of the drones lodges itself inside his body and begins replicating, threatening to release dozens more. Palmer Tech employee Curtis Holt helps Team Arrow successfully destroy the mini-swarm before devising a method to hack Larvan's remaining bees, commanding them to sting her. The overdose of apitoxin leaves Larvan in a coma as she is taken by the police and put in Starling General Hospital to be treated. As of the Flash episode "Gone Rogue", Larvan came out of her coma, receives Spencer Young's meta-tech cellphone to control her robotic bees, and joins forces with Rag Doll, the Weather Witch, and XS for a heist at McCulloch Technologies. While Larvan and Weather Witch betray XS, they are apprehended by the Flash.

References

External links 
 Bug-Eyed Bandit (Bertram Larvan) at DC Comics Wiki
 Bug-Eyed Bandit II at DC Comics Wiki
 Bug-Eyed Bandit at Comic Vine

Characters created by Gardner Fox
Characters created by Gil Kane
DC Comics scientists
DC Comics supervillains
Comics characters introduced in 1966
Comics characters introduced in 1990
Characters created by Keith Giffen
Characters created by J. M. DeMatteis
Fictional roboticists
Fictional entomologists